The Prix Sorcières is an annual literary prize awarded in France since 1986 to works of children's literature in a number of categories. The categories were renamed in 2018.

The prizewinners are decided jointly by the ALSJ (Association des Librairies Spécialisées Jeunesse) and the ABF (Association des Bibliothécaires de France).

Qualifying works must be written in French or translated into French from the original language. Authors from outside France who have won the prize include Anthony Browne, Anne Fine, Michael Morpurgo and J. K. Rowling.

The Prix Sorcières 2020

Carrément Beau Mini category. 
 Emmanuel Lecaye et Marc Majewski, Les mots peints. Ed. L'école des loisirs
 Gaëtan Doremus, Quatre Pattes. Ed. Rouergue 
 Jérôme Ruillier, Où va Mona? Ed. L'Agrume
 Raphaële Enjary et Olivier Philipponneau, Alis. Ed. Albin Michel

Carrément Beau Maxi category 
Winner: Loren Capelli, Cap! Ed. Courtes et Longues
 Matthias Picard, Jim Curious : voyage a travers la jungle. Ed. 2024

 Victoire de Changy et Marine Schneider, L'ours Kintsugi. Ed. Cambourakis
 Emma Adbage, Le repaire. Ed. Cambourakis
 Irène Bonacina, Nos chemins. Ed. Albin Michel

Carrément Passionnant Mini category 
Winner: Agnès Debacker et Anaïs Brunet, L'arrêt du coeur ou comment Simon découvrit l'amour dans une cuisine. Ed. MéMo

 Susin Nielsen, Partis sans laisser d'adresse. Ed. Hélium
 Caroline Solé et Gaya Wisniewski, Akita et les grizzlys. Ed. L'école des loisirs
 Nicolas Deleau et Irène Bonacina, Maskime et les petites choses. Ed. des éléphants
 Marjolaine Nadal et Marianne Pasquet, Du vent dans la tête. Ed. Voce Verso

Carrément Passionnant Maxi category 
 Winner: Flore Vesco, L'estrange Malaventure de Mirella. Ed. L'école des loisirs
 Lauren Wolk, Longtemps j'ai rêvé de mon île. Ed. L'école des loisirs
 Marion Brunet, Sans foi ni loi. Ed. PKJ
 Gary D. Schmidt, Autour de Jupiter. Ed. Bayard
 Marie Pavlenko, Un si petit oiseau. Ed. Flammarion

Carrément Sorcière Fiction category 
Winner: William Grill, Le dernier roi des loups : l'histoire vraie de Lobo le loup et d'Ernest Seton le chasseur. Ed. Sarbacane
 Cornelius (Davide Cali) et Tommaso Carozzi, Le jour des baleines. Ed. Chocolat!
 Shaun Tan, Cigale. Ed. Gallimard
 Stéphane Kiehl, Vert : une histoire dans la jungle. Ed. De la Marinière
 Laura Bellini, Les puces et le renard. Ed. Atelier du Poisson Soluble

Carrément Sorcière Non-Fiction category 

 Winner: Philippe Nessmann et Régis Lejonc, Dans tous les sens. Ed. Seuil
 Morgane Soularue et Camille de Cussac, Cheveux et autres poils. Ed. Gallimard
 Monika Vaicenaviciene, Qu'est-ce qu'un fleuve? Ed. Cambourakis
 JR, Les rides. Ed. Phaidon
 Delphine Perret, Kaleidescopage. Ed. Rouergue

The Prix Sorcières 2019

Carrément Beau Mini category 

Winner: Delphine Perret, Une super histoire de cow-boy. Ed. Fourmis rouges
 Elis Wilk, L'appel de la lune. Ed. Versant Sud
 Laetitia Bourget et Alice Gravier, Ma maison. Ed. Grandes personnes
 Emilie Vast, Moi, j'ai peur du loup. Ed. MeMo
 Kitty Crowther, Petites histoires de nuits. Ed. EDL

Carrément Beau Maxi category 
Winner: Pierre-Jacques Ober, Jules Ober et Felicity Coonan, Petit soldat. Ed. Seuil
 Marion Duval, Toi-même. Ed. Albin Michel
 Carmen Chica et Manuel Marsol, La montagne. Ed. Fourmis rouges
 Marie Dorléans, Nous avons rendez-vous. Ed. Seuil
 Rebecca Dautremer, Les riches heures de Jacominus Gainsborough. Ed. Sarbacane

Carrément Passionnant Mini category 

Winner: Kieran Larwood, La légende de Podkin le brave, Tome 1. Ed. Gallimard
 Adrien Albert, Claude et Morino. Ed. EDL
 Alexandre Chardin, Mentir aux étoiles. Ed. Casterman
 Audren, La petite épopée des pions. Ed. MeMo
 Céline Claire et Clémence Pollet, Un chien comme ça. Ed. Voce verso

Carrément Passionnant Maxi category 
 Winner: Nastasia Rugani, Milly Vodovic. Ed. MeMo
 Lauren Wolk, La combe aux loups. Ed. EDL
 Davide Morosinotto, Le célèbre catalogue Walker & Dawn. Ed. EDL
 Marie-Sophie Vermot, Soixante-douze heures. Ed. Thierry Magnier
 Severine Vidal, Pëppo. Ed. Bayard

Carrément Sorcière Fiction category 
Winner: Manuel Marsol, Duel au soleil. Ed. Agrume
 Tom Haugomat, À travers. Ed. Thierry Magnier
 Riccardo Bozzi, Violeta Lopiz et Valerio Vidali, La forêt. Ed. Gallimard
 Raphaële Frier et Julien Martinière, Le tracas de Blaise. Ed. Atelier du Poisson soluble
 Joanna Concejo et Olga Tokarczuk, Une âme égarée. Ed. Format

Carrément Sorcière Non-Fiction category 

 Winner: Fanny Pageaud, Musée des museaux amusants. Ed. Poisson soluble
 Sylvain Azial et Hélène Rajcak, Panthera tigris. Ed. Rouergue
 Claire Cantais, Big Bang Pop! Ed. Poisson soluble
 Alexandra Litvina et Ania Desnitskaïa, L’appartement : un siècle d’histoire russe. Ed. Globe
 Alexandre Galand et Delphine Jacquot, Monstres & Merveilles. Ed. Seuil

The Prix Sorcières 2018

Carrément Beau Mini category 

 Winner: Giovanna Zoboli, illus. Mariachiara Di Giorgio, Profession Crocodile. Ed. Les Fourmis rouges
 Gaëtan Dorémus, Minute papillon! Ed. Rouergue
 Margaux Othats, Blanc. Ed. Magnani
 Coralie Bickford-Smith et Marie Ollier, Le renard et l’étoile. Ed. Gallimard
 Isabelle Simler, Doux rêveurs. Ed. Courtes et longues

Carrément Beau Maxi category 
 Winner: Chiara Mezzalama, illus. Régis Lejonc, Le jardin du dedans dehors. Ed. Les éditions des éléphants
 Gilles Baum, illus. Thierry Dedieu, D’entre les ogres. Ed. Seuil

 Anne-Margot Ramstein et Matthias Arégui, Dedans-Dehors. Ed. Albin Michel

 Michaël Escoffier, illus. Kris Di Giacomo, La leçon. Ed. Frimousse
 Pierre Zenzius, L’ascension de Saussure. Ed. Rouergue

Carrément Passionnant Mini category 

 Winner: Sara Pennypacker, illus. Jon Klassen, Pax et le petit soldat. Ed. Gallimard
 Peter Brown, Robot sauvage. Ed. Gallimard Jeunesse
 Jonathan Garnier, illus. Rony Hotin, Momo T.1. Ed. Casterman
 Michelle Montmoulinex, Baleine rouge. Ed. Hélium
 Mauri Christophe, illus. Marie Caudry, Le Petit Poucet, c’est moi! Ed. Casterman

Carrément Passionnant Maxi category 
 Winner: Stéphane Servant, Sirius. Ed. Rouergue
 Danielle Younge-Ullman, Toute la beauté du monde n’a pas disparu. Ed. Gallimard
 Gary-D Schmidt, Jusqu’ici tout va bien. Ed. École des Loisirs
 Eric Pessan, Dans la forêt de Hokkaido. Ed. École des Loisirs
 Anne-Laure Bondoux, illus. Coline Peyrony, L’aube sera grandiose. Ed. Gallimard

Carrément Sorcière Fiction category 
 Winner: Henri Meunier et Régis Lejonc, Cœur de bois. Ed. Notari
 Christian Lagrange, De la terre à la pluie. Ed. Seuil
 ,Nina Wehrle et Evelyne Laube, Marta & moi. It’s raining elephants. Ed. Notari
 Jeanne Macaigne, L’Hiver d’Isabelle. Ed. MeMo
 Thomas Vinau, illus. Bertrand Salé, L’aube appartient aux pies. Ed. Motus

Carrément Sorcière Non-Fiction category 

 Winner: Cruschiform, Colorama. Ed. Gallimard

 Liuna Virardi, Comment tout a commencé. Ed. MeMo
 Marie Desplechin, illus. Betty Bone, Ta race, moi et les autres. Ed. Courtes et longues
 Pablo Salvaje, Âme animale. Ed. Nathan
 Marie-Eve de grave, illus. Jean-Jacques de Grave, L’histoire de Ned Kelly. Ed. Hélium

Winners of the Toddlers (Tout-Petits) category, 1987–2017 
 1987 : , illustrated by Anne Bozellec, Liberté Nounours, Le sourire qui mord, "Plaisirs" coll.
 1988 : Claude Ponti, Adèle s'en mêle, Gallimard Jeunesse
 1990 : Jan Ormerod, Une casserole pour jouer, Milan
 1992 : Grégoire Solotareff, Les bêtises de Bébé Ours, Hatier
 1993 : Julie, Pas vu, pas pris, 
 1994 : Charlotte Mollet, Une souris verte, 
 1995 : Sam Mac Bratney, illustrated by Anita Jeram, Guess How Much I Love You, 
 1996 : Trish Cooke and Helen Oxenbury, Très, très fort !, Flammarion
 1997 : Claude Ponti, Sur la branche, L'École des loisirs
 1998 : Jeanne Ashbé, Et dedans il y a..., L'École des loisirs, "Pastel" coll.
 1999 : , illustrated by Nicole Claveloux, Alboum, Éditions Être
 2000 : Antonin Louchard and Katy Couprie, Tout un monde, 
 2001 : , Pourquôôââ, Éditions Thierry Magnier
 2002 : , Dix petites graines, Gallimard Jeunesse
 2003 : Chantal Groléziat, Paul Mindy and Élodie Nouhen, Comptines et berceuses du baobab, 
 2004 : Martine Perrin, Méli-Mélo, Milan
 2005 : Jean Gourounas, Grosse légume, 
 2006 : , Qui où quoi, Milan
 2007 : Audrey Poussier, Mon Pull, L'École des loisirs
 2008 : Claire Dé, Ouvre les yeux, 
 2009 : Anne Crausaz, Raymond rêve, 
 2010 : Cécile Boyer, Ouaf miaou cui-cui, Albin Michel Jeunesse
 2011 : Hervé Tullet, Un livre, Bayard jeunesse
 2012 : Chris Haughton, Un peu perdu, éditions 
 2013 : Lucie Félix, Deux yeux,  
 2014 : , Le jour la nuit tout autour, Hélium
 2015 : Édouard Manceau, Le petit curieux, Ed. Milan Jeunesse
 2016 : Corinne Dreyfuss, Pomme, pomme, pomme, Éditions Thierry Magnier
 2017 : 'Delphine Chedru, Paul a dit! Tourne la page et découvre la surprise, Hélium

Winners of the Album (Albums) category, 1986–2017 
 1986 : Toshi Yoshida, La querelle, 
 1987 : Michael Palin, Richard Seymour, illustrated by Alan Lee, La pierre de cristal, Casterman
 1988 : Anne Quesemand, Laurent Berman, La mort marraine, Ipomoea
 1989 : Claude Clément, Le luthier de Venise, 
 1990 : Michael Rosen and Helen Oxenbury, La chasse à l’ours, Ouest-France
 1991 : Philippe Corentin, L'Afrique de Zigomar, L'École des loisirs
 1992 : Joan Manuel Gisbert, illustrated by Alfonso Ruano, Le gardien de l’oubli, 
 1993 : , Les derniers géants, Casterman
 1994 : Werner Holzwarth and Wolf Erlbruch, De la petite taupe qui voulait savoir qui lui avait fait sur la tête, Milan
 1995 : , Yakouba, Seuil jeunesse
 1996 : Philippe Corentin, L’ogre, le loup, la petite fille et le gâteau, L'École des loisirs
 1998 : , Toujours rien, 
 1999 : , Une histoire à quatre voix, Kaleidoscope
 2000 : Michael Morpurgo, illustrated by Christian Birmingham, La sagesse de Wombat, Gautier-Languereau
 2001 : Peter Sís, Madlenka, Grasset Jeunesse
 2002 : David Wiesner, Les trois cochons, 
 2004 : , L'amoureux, Gautier-Languereau
 2005 : Wolf Erlbruch, La Grande question, Éditions Être
 2006 : Magali Le Huche, Les Sirènes de Belpêchao, 
 2007 : , La Caresse du papillon, 
 2009 : Stian Hole, L'été de Garmann, Albin Michel Jeunesse
 2010 : Isabelle Carrier, La petite casserole d'Anatole, 
 2011 : Germano Zullo and Albertine, Les oiseaux, 
 2012 : Anne Herbauts, De quelle couleur est le vent ?, éditions Casterman
 2013 : Kenya Hirata, illustrated by Kunio Katô, La maison en petits cubes,  éditions 
 2014 : Roberto Innocenti and Aaron Frisch, La petite fille en rouge, Gallimard
 2015 : Edward Van de Vendel , Le chien que Nino n'avait pas, Didier Jeunesse
 2016 : Frédéric Marais, Yasuké, Éd. Les fourmis rouges
 2017 : Nada Matta, Petite Pépite,

Winners of the Early readers (Premières lectures) category, 1989–2017 
 1989 : Marie-Aude Murail, Le chien des mers, 
 1990 : Marie-Aude Murail, illustrated by Michel Gay, Le hollandais sans peine, L'École des loisirs
 1991 : Ann Cameron, illustrated by Thomas B. Allen, Le plus bel endroit du monde, L'École des loisirs
 1992 : Claude Ponti, Broutille, L'École des loisirs
 1993 : , illustré par Philippe Dumas, Le cheval qui sourit, L'École des loisirs
 1994 : , Flon-Flon et Musette, L'École des loisirs
 1995 : Danielle Fossette, illustrated by Véronique Boiry, Je ne veux pas aller au tableau, 
 1996 : , Colorbelle-ébène, L'École des loisirs
 1997 : Didier Lévy and Coralie Gallibour, Peut-on faire confiance à un crocodile affamé ?, Albin Michel Jeunesse
 1998 : Anne Fine, Journal d'un chat assassin, L'École des loisirs
 1999 : , Mademoiselle Zazie a-t-elle un zizi ?, 
 2000 : , illustrated by Mireille d’Allancé, Joker, L'École des loisirs
 2003 : , Le Père Tire-Bras, 
 2004 : Claude Helft, illustrated by Jiang Hong Chen, Hatchiko chien de Tokyo, 
 2005 : Hanno, Sur le bout des doigts, Éditions Thierry Magnier
 2006 : , Cinq, six bonheurs, Éditions Thierry Magnier
 2007 : Delphine Bournay, Grignotin et Mentalo, L'École des loisirs
 2008 : Gustave Akakpo, Le Petit monde merveilleux, 
 2009 : not awarded
 2010 : Valérie Zenatti, illustrated by Audrey Poussier, Vérité, vérité chérie, 
 2011 : Mélanie Rutten, Oko, un thé en hiver, 
 2012 : Colas Gutman, L'enfant, L'École des loisirs
 2013 : , illustrated by Ronan Badel, Émile est invisible, édition Gallimard Jeunesse, collection Giboulées
 2014 : Agnès Domergue et Cécile Hudrisier, Il était une fois... Contes en haïkus, Thierry Magnier
 2015 : Hélène Rice (text), Ronan Badel (illustrator), Le meilleur livre pour apprendre à dessiner une vache, 
 2016 : Jacques Goldstyn, L'arbragan, La pastèque
 2017 : Delphine Perret, Björn: six histoires d'ours, Éd. Les fourmis rouges

Winners of the Novels (Romans) category (until 1997) 
 1986 : Bethan Roberts, Manganinnie et l’enfant volé, Flammarion
 1987 : Azouz Begag, Le gône du châaba, Éditions du Seuil
 1988 : Natalie Babitt, Les yeux de l’amaryllis, Gallimard Jeunesse
 1989 : , Un pacte avec le diable, 
 1990 : , La maison vide, Gallimard Jeunesse
 1991 : Feng Jicai, Que cent fleurs s’épanouissent, Gallimard Jeunesse
 1992 : , C’est la vie, Lili, Syros
 1994 : , La fille du canal, 
 1995 : , Le chevalier de Terre Noire, Book 1 : L’adieu au domaine and Book 2 : Le bras de la vengeance, 
 1996 : , Avec tout ce qu’on a fait pour toi, Seuil Jeunesse
 1997 : Luis Sepulveda, illustrated by Miles Hyman, Histoire d’une mouette et du chat qui lui apprit à voler,  et Éditions du Seuil

Winners of the Junior novels (Romans juniors) category, 1998–2017 
 1998 : Yaël Hassan, Un Grand-père tombé du ciel, Casterman
 1999 : J. K. Rowling, Harry Potter à l'école des sorciers, Gallimard
 2000 : , L’Enfant Océan, 
 2002 : Sylvie Weil, Le Mazal d'Elvina, "Medium" coll.
 2003 : , illustrated by Monike Czarnecki, P’tite mère, "Roman du Monde" coll.
 2004 : Brigitte Smadja, Il faut sauver Saïd, L'École des loisirs
 2005 : Anne Vantal, Chère Théo, Éditions 
 2006 : , Bjorn le Morphir, L'École des loisirs
 2007 : Timothée de Fombelle, Gallimard
 2008 : Jerry Spinelli, Z comme Zinkoff, L'École des loisirs
 2009 : Ulrich Hub, L'Arche part à 8 heures, 
 2010 : Maria Parr, translated by Jean-Baptiste Coursaud, Cascades et gaufres à gogo, 
 2011 :  and Marianne Ratier, La petite taiseuse, Éditions Naïve
 2012 : Hermann Schulz, Mandela et Nelson, L'École des loisirs
 2013 : Brian Selznick, Black out, Bayard jeunesse
 2014 : Pam Muñoz Ryan, Le rêveur, illustrated by Peter Sis, Bayard jeunesse
 2015 : Katherine Rundell, Le ciel nous appartient (Trad. Emmanuelle Ghez), Les grandes personnes
 2016 : Michael Morpurgo, Le mystère de Lucy Lost, Gallimard jeunesse
 2017 : Jakob Wegelius, Sally Jones, Éditions Thierry Magnier

Winners of the Adolescent novels (Romans ados) category, 1998–2017 
 1998 : Berthe Burko-Falcman, L’enfant caché, Le Seuil
 1999 : , Au cinéma Lux, 
 2000 : , Sombres citrouilles, "Medium" coll.
 2001 : Louis Sachar, Le Passage (translation of Holes), L'École des loisirs, "Medium" coll.
 2002 : Anne-Lise Grobéty, Le temps des mots à voix basse, 
 2003 : Celia Rees, Journal d'une sorcière, Le Seuil
 2004 : , Les Larmes de l’assassin, Bayard, Millézime coll.
 2005 : Michael Morpurgo, Soldat Peaceful, Éditions Gallimard Jeunesse
 2006 : Marie-Sabine Roger, Le Quatrième soupirail, 
 2007 : , Je mourrai pas gibier, 
 2011 : David Almond, illustrated by Dave McKean, Le Sauvage, Gallimard Jeunesse
 2012 : , L'Innocent de Palerme, Éditions des grandes personnes
 2013 : , Max, Gallimard Jeunesse, "Scripto" coll.
 2014 : Jacqueline Kelly, Calpurnia, L'Ecole des loisirs, "Medium" coll.
 2015 : Anne Fine, Le Passage du diable (The devil walks, trad. Dominique Kugler), L'école des loisirs
 2016 : Clémentine Beauvais, Les petites reines, Sarbacane
 2017 : , Le fils de l'Ursari, L'école des loisirs

Winners of the Non-fiction (Documentaires) category, 1986–2017 
 1986 : Joanna Cole, Kenneth Lily, Animaux de jour, grandeur nature and Animaux de nuit, grandeur nature, Casterman
 1987 : Michel Pierre, with Antoine Sabbagh, illustrated by Morgan, L’Europe du Moyen Âge, Casterman
 1989 : David Burnie, Le nid, l’œuf et l’oiseau, Gallimard Jeunesse
 1990 : Sophie Curtil, Giacometti, Centre Pompidou
 1992 : Renée Kayser, Copain des villes, Milan
 1993 : Jean-Michel Rodrigo, illustrated by Hélène Perdereau, Pérou, destination bidonvilles, Albin-Michel jeunesse
 1995 : Dominique Gaussen, Louis XIV et Versailles, 
 1996 : Brigitte Govignon (under the dir.), La petite encyclopédie de l’art, Réunion des musées nationaux and 
 1997 : Stephen Johnson, Alphabetville, 
 1998 : Marie Lagier, Le livre du loup, 
 1999 : , Zappe la guerre, 
 2000 : Chrystel Proupuech, Yapa le petit aborigène d’Australie, 
 2001 : , illustrated by Marion Lesage, L'Afrique, petit Chaka..., Réunion des musées nationaux
 2002 : Elizabeth Combres, Florence Thinard, Emmanuel de la Grange, Mondes Rebelles : junior, 
 2003 : , Du coq à l’âne : Les animaux racontent l’art, Le Seuil - Man on Wire
 2004 : Ursus Wehrli, L’art en bazar, Milan
 2005 : Véronique Antoine-Andersen, L’art pour comprendre le monde,  
 2006 : Catherine Louis, calligraphy by Shi Bo, Mon imagier chinois, Éditions Philippe Picquier
 2007 : , Enfants d'ici, parents d'ailleurs : histoire et mémoire de l'exode rural et de l'immigration, Gallimard
 2008 : Claire Didier and Roland Guarrigue, Le livre des trous, 
 2009 : Caroline Laffon, Costumes, 
 2010 : Marie-Sabine Roger, illustrated by Anne Sol, À quoi tu joues ?, 
 2012 : Julie Lannes, Chimères génétiques, 
 2013 : Aleksandra Mizielinska and Daniel Mizielinski, Cartes : voyages parmi mille curiosités et merveilles du monde, 
L'encyclopédie qui parle d'amitié, d'amour et de sexe aux enfants, Oskar
 2015 :  (text and illustration) and Christophe Ylla-Somers, Nous, notre histoire, L'école des loisirs
 2016 : Pascale Hédelin, Cité Babel, Éd. des éléphants
 2017 : Julie Guillem, Atlas des nuages, Ed. Actes Sud Junior

Winners of the Special prize, 1989–2014 
 1989 : Prix spécial Révolution for Hervé Luxardo and Gérard Finel, Douze idées qui changèrent le monde : la Révolution française, 
 1991 : Grand prix spécial for ten years of the  association
 1993 : Daniel Pennac, Comme un roman, Gallimard
 1997 : , La chaise bleue, 
 2001 : , Du pays des amazones aux îles Indigo, Du pays de Jade à l’île Quinookta, De la rivière rouge au pays des Zizotls, Casterman and Gallimard
 2002 : Robert Cormier
 2006 : Claude Ponti
 2007 : 
 2010 : 
 2012 : 
 2014 : Tomi Ungerer

See also

List of literary awards

References

External links
ALSJ website
ABF: Prix Sorcières

Children's literary awards
Awards established in 1986
French literary awards
1986 establishments in France